Z-Library (abbreviated as z-lib, formerly BookFinder) is a shadow library project for file-sharing access to scholarly journal articles, academic texts and general-interest books. It began as a mirror of Library Genesis, from which most of its books originate.

According to the Alexa Traffic Rank service, Z-Library was ranked as the 8,182nd most active website in October 2021. Z-Library is particularly popular in emerging economies and among academics. As of January 1, 2023, Z-Library reported to have more than 11,828,754 books and 84,837,643 articles. The organization describes itself as "the world's largest e-book library", as well as "the world's largest scientific articles store", and operates as a non-profit organization sustained by donations.

The Z-Library project and its activities may be considered illegal in some jurisdictions. In November 2022, the clearnet domains of the website were seized by the U.S. Department of Justice, and two Russian nationals associated with the project were arrested on charges related to copyright infringement and money laundering in Argentina. While the website seizures reduced the accessibility of the content, it still remains available on the dark web. The legal status of the project, as well as its potential impact on the publishing industry and authors' rights, is a matter of ongoing debate.

Despite the legal challenges, the Z-Library project has gained significant support from users, particularly students and researchers in underfunded institutions who rely on its resources for their studies and work. Some authors have also defended the project, arguing that it provides a valuable service by increasing access to knowledge and promoting education in underprivileged communities.

In response to the law enforcement action, a group of anonymous archivists launched Anna's Archive, a free non-profit online shadow library metasearch engine (purportedly via IPFS) providing access to a variety of book resources. The team claims to provide metadata access to Open Library materials, to be a backup of the Library Genesis and Z-Library shadow libraries, presents ISBN information, has no copyrighted materials on its website, and only indexes metadata that is already publicly available.

On February 11, 2023, Z-Library returned to the regular Internet through private personal domains created from accounts on the platform.

History 

The footer in the project's pages contains the phrase "Free ebooks since 2009."

Legal status 

Z-Library has cycled through domain names, some of which have been blocked by domain registry operators. Z-Library remained reachable via alternative domains, and is also accessible through the .onion-linked Tor network. The United States Postal Inspection Service appeared on a seizure notice, but according to the agency, this was a mistake.

As of November 4, 2022, the Z-Library staff had only noted a hosting issue; the website's hidden service on the Tor network was still accessible. As of November 7, 2022, at least two Z-Library Clearnet domains were also still operating. In November 2022, many Z-Library domain names were seized by the U.S. Department of Justice and Federal Bureau of Investigation. Nonetheless, as of November 2022, the Z-Library website continues to be active and accessible through the Tor network and the I2P network.

United Kingdom 

In mid-2015, The Publishers Association, a UK organization, attempted to enact internet service provider-level blocks on Z-Library. In late 2015, publisher Elsevier filed a successful court request that ordered the registrar of bookfi.org to seize the site's internet domain.

United States 

Bookfi.org, booksc.org and b-ok.org were included in the 2017 Office of the United States Trade Representative report on notorious markets.

Z-Library's domains were temporarily blocked in 2021 after a DMCA notice issued by Harvard Business Publishing. The domain suspensions were later lifted.

In October 2022, TikTok blocked hashtags related to Z-Library after it gained popularity there and the Authors Guild submitted a complaint to the United States Trade Representative. On November 3, 2022, many of Z-Library's domain names were seized by the United States Department of Justice and Federal Bureau of Investigation in response to a court order. Over 240 domains were seized.

The executive director of the Authors Alliance, a group dedicated to increasing access for literature, commented that the takedown of Z-Library domains was, "a kind of symptom of how broken the system is, particularly when you're looking at access to scientific articles... It really speaks to the failure of the paywall subscription access system that we have." On 5 November 2022, the Hindu right wing group Swadeshi Jagran Manch formally objected that the FBI's seizure of the Indian domain name 1LIB.IN (used by Z-lib) merely by the District Judge of New York's order without jurisdiction had violated India's sovereignty.

An initial seizure notice, that in part credited the U.S. Postal Inspection Service with the takedown of domains, was later corrected. When the domains z-lib.org, b-ok.org, and 3lib.net were seized, the DNS servers utilised switched to NS1.SEIZEDSERVERS.COM and NS2.SEIZEDSERVERS.COM, used commonly in US law enforcement seizures. However, these DNS servers have switched to Njalla, an anonymous hosting provider.

Arrests 

On November 16, 2022, U.S. Attorneys for the Eastern District of New York of the Department of Justice unsealed the indictment for two Russian nationals: Anton Napolsky and Valeriia Ermakova. They were charged with criminal copyright infringement, wire fraud and money laundering for operating the Z-Library website. The pair had been arrested in Argentina on November 3, 2022. The indictment pertains to alleged criminal activity taking place from 2018 to 2022, though the pair are suspected to have operated Z-Library for "over a decade". According to TorrentFreak, the arrests were accomplished by the FBI with data from Google and Amazon (among other sites), accessed with search warrants, that helped identify the founders of the website.

The investigation was formally assisted by The Publishers Association along with the Authors Guild, and indirectly, reportedly, by BREIN, the Dutch anti-piracy group. The Authors Guild issued a statement supporting the arrests, commenting that it was "one of the biggest breakthroughs in the fight against online criminal e-book piracy to date". However, the executive director for the Authors Alliance commented, "I certainly don't condone illegal behavior, but I think this seizure and press release highlight how broken our copyright system is".

Impact 

Decreased accessibility to Z-Library and its services has substantially impacted students, professors, authors and others throughout the world. Not all authors, in fact, agree with trying to close down Z-Library, and at least one published author, Alison Rumfitt, has come to defend maintaining access to Z-Library and related libraries. Further, one immediate consequence to the law enforcement action has been the launch, by a group of anonymous archivists, of Anna's Archive, a free non-profit online shadow library metasearch engine (purportedly via IPFS) providing access to a variety of book resources. The team claims to provide metadata access to Open Library materials, to be a backup of the Library Genesis and Z-Library shadow libraries, presents ISBN information, has no copyrighted materials on its website, and only indexes metadata that is already publicly available.

On November 20, 2022, TorrentFreak reported that, in response to the recent enforcement efforts, the Z-Library team stated that they were sorry for the arrests, and for the suffering of authors. The Z-Library team asked the authors for their forgiveness, and noted that the team will do their best to respond to all of the author's complaints if the author's rights have been violated. Further, the team stated that they "believe the knowledge and cultural heritage of mankind should be accessible to all people around the world, regardless of their wealth, social status, nationality, citizenship, etc. This is the only purpose Z-Library is made for.” Numerous words of support from Z-Library users for the help they received from Z-Library services over the years were also reported by TorrentFreak. Whether or not the remaining members of the team will be held accountable was also raised as a concern in the report. As of November 30, 2022, the Z-Library website continues to be active and accessible through the Tor network and the I2P network. Besides the recently launched Anna's Archive website, many other alternative workarounds to the recent attempts to take down the Z-Library website have been reported. Some of these purported alternative sites have submitted unusual takedown requests of their own, according to news reports.

India 

The website was banned in India in August 2022, following a court order from the Tis Hazari district court, after a complaint which stated that the copyrights of ten books (pertaining to the topics of tax and corporate law) were being violated by Z-Library. Internet service providers in India were directed to block the site. The decision to block Z-Library and other shadow libraries has been criticized by some Indian authors, students, academics, and freedom of information activists.

France 

In September 2022, it was announced that the Syndicat national de l'édition (National Publishing Union) in France succeeded in a legal challenge to the website, having filed a complaint against about two-hundred domains and mirror site domains associated with it. The decision was made by the Tribunal Judiciaire de Paris, a court in Paris; internet service providers in France were directed to block the domains.

Website 

The site's operation is financed by user donations, that are collected twice a year (September and March) through a fundraising campaign. Over the years, various URL addresses and direct IP addresses have been used for Z-Library as dozens of domain names have been confiscated by various legal authorities.

Functionality 

Unlike Library Genesis and Sci-Hub, not much is known about Z-Library in terms of its operation, management, commercial status and mission statement. Notably, Z-Library does not open its full database to the public. Despite that, its database, excluding books from libgen, was mirrored by archivists in 2022.

In an effort to prevent blacklisting of domains (oftentimes by internet providers at the DNS-level in accordance with legal procedures), Z-Library used a homepage at a memorable domain. The homepage did not contain any infringing content, but instead listed many working mirror domains for different regions. These domains could be switched and did not need to be as memorable. For instance, some included numbers. This however did not help, the domain "z-lib.org" was seized in 2022 nevertheless.

The Z-Library team claimed, in March 2019, to have servers in Finland, Germany, Luxembourg, Malaysia, Panama, Russia and the United States, and the size of their database is over 220 TB.

Reception 

In an essay titled "Herding the Wind: A journey to the strange world of the e-library in the autumn of the year 2020", library activist Mikael Böök connected the purpose of Z-Library to the five laws of library science by S. R. Ranganathan.

See also 

 Anna's Archive
 Electronic Frontier Foundation
 Freedom of information
 #ICanHazPDF (hashtag)
 JSTOR
 Open Library
 Sci-Hub

References

External links 

 
 zlibrary on Reddit

Book websites
File sharing communities
Intellectual property activism
Internet censorship in India
Internet censorship in the United States
Internet properties established in 2009
Russian digital libraries
Search engine software
Shadow libraries
Domain name seizures by United States